Wheldon Road (known as the Mend-A-Hose Jungle for sponsorship purposes) is the home ground of Castleford Tigers Rugby league Club in Castleford, West Yorkshire, England. It is on Wheldon Road, just outside Castleford town centre. The record attendance of 25,449 was for a Challenge Cup match in 1935.

History
Wheldon Road officially opened in 1926 and was the home of association football club Castleford Town F.C. The following year Castleford RLFC moved in after the completion of their first season (1926–27) after playing at 'Sandy Desert', which has since been redeveloped, and is the home of Castleford Lock Lane.

The record attendance at the ground is 25,449 for a third round Challenge Cup match against Hunslet in 1935. The record Super League attendance at the ground is 11,731 against Leeds on 7 March 2004.

Floodlights were installed for the 1965–66 season.

In 2011 the Castleford signed a deal with developers who intended to redevelop the ground as a supermarket. This deal would fund a new £12 million stadium at nearby Glasshoughton for which the club had received planning consent. In October 2012 the plans were scrapped due to lack of funding. In 2014 it was announced that the club would be moving to a new stadium near Glasshoughton along with a new retail park on the same site.

Layout

North Stand
The Wheldon Road End is a covered standing terrace and is considered the Kop end of the ground as it is particularly used by Castleford supporters.

East Stand
The Main Stand in the east end of the ground houses 1,500 seats and the changing rooms and tunnel. About two thirds of the stand is uncovered terracing each side of the Main Stand. The clubs pavilion is situated at this side of the ground. Most of the bars and food outlets are at this side of the ground inside the marquee

South Stand
The Railway End is at the south of the ground. It is an uncovered standing terrace, with a supporters' club, executive boxes and a scoreboard along its top. It is mainly used by away supporters.

West Stand
The Princess Street Stand is at the west of the ground. It is almost identical to the Wheldon Road End. It is completely covered and houses the TV and commentary gantry.

Sponsors
The stadium was renamed the Jungle from 2000 to 2010, initially due to sponsorship from online retailer Jungle.com. In 2010 PROBIZ became the stadium's sponsors after signing a three year deal. Wish Communications became sponsors for the 2013 season before Mend-a-Hose became sponsors in 2014.

International Matches

Rugby League Test Matches
List of International rugby league matches played at Wheldon Road is:

Rugby League Tour Matches
Other than Castleford club games, Wheldon Road also saw Cas play host to various international touring teams from 1929–1994.

Gallery

References

External links

 Castleford Tigers official site

Buildings in Castleford, West Yorkshire
Rugby league stadiums in England
Rugby League World Cup stadiums
Sport in the City of Wakefield
Castleford Tigers